Sheen (Kashmiri/Sanskrit: Snow) is a 2004 Indian Bollywood film produced and directed by Ashok Pandit. It stars Raj Babbar, Tarun Arora and Sheen in pivotal roles.The film deals with the plight of the Kashmiri Pandits, who fled their homes as refugees in the light of the Kashmir insurgency.

Cast
 Raj Babbar as Pandit Amarnath
 Tarun Arora as Mannu
 Sheen as Samreen Zaidi 
 Anup Soni
 Kiran Juneja
 Mukesh Rishi

Soundtrack
The music for the film is composed by Nadeem-Shravan.

Release and Reception
A special screening of the film was held at Human Rights Violation Conference in Geneva on 8 April 2004. The film was released theatrically in India on 7 May 2004.

IndiaFM gave the film 1.5 stars out of 5, writing ″If SHEEN belongs to anyone, it's Raj Babbar who delivers a knock-out performance. The veteran seems to be in form after a long, long time and has been offered a role where he can sink his teeth into. The helplessness of a father and that of being uprooted is performed in the most convincing manner by the actor. Anoop Soni as the terrorist leaves an equally strong impression. Sheen makes a confident debut. Tarun Arora draws a blank this time around. He gets no scope at all. Kiran Juneja and Samay Pandit are adequate. On the whole, SHEEN will meet with diverse reactions - a few might empathize with the issue, while others may not really want to reopen the wounds. IndiaGlitz wrote ″Budgetary constraints diminish much of the director's heartfelt pain. So do the performances.″

References

External links
 

2000s Hindi-language films
2004 films
Films scored by Nadeem–Shravan
Films set in Jammu and Kashmir
Kashmir conflict in films